

Division 6 Dalsland

References 

8
Division 6 (Swedish football) seasons